Richard William McDowell (born 29 June 1973) is a New Zealand soil scientist and former first-class cricketer. A professor at Lincoln University, McDowell was awarded the Hutton Medal of the Royal Society Te Apārangi in 2021.

Biography
McDowell was born at Invercargill on 29 June 1973. He studied in New Zealand at Lincoln University, graduating with a Bachelor of Science with first-class honours in 1996, before studying in England for his PhD at the University of Cambridge. His doctoral thesis, completed in 2000, was titled Processes invoved in controlling phosphorus release to surface and sub-surface runoff.

While studying at Cambridge, McDowell played first-class cricket for Cambridge University Cricket Club in 1999, making a single appearance against Kent at Fenner's. 

Since returning to New Zealand, McDowell has had a prominent role in the field of land and water resources, becoming a principal scientist at AgResearch. In 2010 he was appointed an adjunct professor and in 2014 he was made a full professor in the Department of Soil and Physical Sciences at Lincoln University. In 2014, he was appointed chief scientist of the National Science Challenge: Our Land and Water. In June 2021, McDowell was appointed editor-in-chief of the Journal of the Royal Society of New Zealand. 

In 2017, McDowell was elected a Fellow of the Royal Society of New Zealand in 2017. He is also a Fellow of the New Zealand Society of Soil Science. In November 2021, he was awarded the Hutton Medal by the Royal Society Te Apārangi, for his work on nutrient flows from land to water.

References

External links

1973 births
Living people
People from Invercargill
Lincoln University (New Zealand) alumni
Alumni of the University of Cambridge
New Zealand cricketers
Cambridge University cricketers
New Zealand soil scientists
Academic staff of the Lincoln University (New Zealand)
Fellows of the Royal Society of New Zealand